Michela Balducci (born 30 March 1995) is an Italian professional racing cyclist, who currently rides for UCI Women's Continental Team .

She rode in the 2014 Giro d'Italia Femminile on the  team, finishing in 130th place.

Major results
2011
 2nd Road race, National Novice Road Championships

References

External links
 

1995 births
Living people
Italian female cyclists
Place of birth missing (living people)
People from Pontedera
Sportspeople from the Province of Pisa
Cyclists from Tuscany
21st-century Italian women